Different Strokes (also titled Different Strokes:  The Story of Jack and Jill...and Jill) is a 1998 erotic drama film about a love triangle involving a young couple and another woman.  Written and directed by Michael Paul Girard, the film stars Dana Plato, Landon Hall and Bentley Mitchum. The film's title is an allusion to Plato's fame from the TV series, Diff'rent Strokes. It was Plato's first film appearance since 1992, and would be her second to last film before her death in 1999.

Nathan Rabin gave the film a harsh review, stating, "The shamelessly titled Different Strokes (...) lacks anything resembling even community-theater-level acting", concluding the film "is notable mainly for its aggressive lack of shame. From its title to its threadbare plot to its community-access-level production values, the film reeks of crass exploitation."

References

External links 
 
 
 

1990s erotic drama films
1998 romantic drama films
1998 independent films
1990s pornographic films
1998 films
American LGBT-related films
1998 LGBT-related films
American romantic drama films
Female bisexuality in film
1990s English-language films
American erotic drama films
American pornographic films
American erotic romance films
Films about sexuality
Film controversies
Films set in Los Angeles
Films shot in Los Angeles
American independent films
Lesbian-related films
LGBT-related drama films
LGBT-related romantic drama films
LGBT-related controversies in film
Obscenity controversies in film
Rating controversies in film
Films directed by Michael Paul Girard
1990s American films